Lovers in a Park is a 1758 oil painting on canvas by François Boucher. It is held at the Timken Museum of Art, in San Diego. It depicts a scene that takes place in a park with a luscious vegetation, where a couple of lovers is surprised by a female peasant who is passing by.

References

1758 paintings
Paintings by François Boucher
Paintings in the collection of the Timken Museum of Art
Paintings of people